A paperboy is a young person delivering newspapers to homes.

Paperboy or Paperboys may also refer to:

Film and television 
 The Paperboy (1994 film), a Canadian horror film by Douglas Jackson, named after the role
 The Paperboy (2012 film), an American drama by Lee Daniels
 Paperboys (film), a 2001 American documentary by Mike Mills
 Paper Boys, a 2009 American coming-of-age film by Bryan E. Hall
 The Paperboy, a fictional character in the British sitcom Fawlty Towers
 Paper Boy,  a 2018 Indian romantic film

Literature 
 The Paperboy (novel), a 1995 novel by Pete Dexter
 Paperboy (novel), a 2013 novel by Vince Vawter
 Paperboy, a 1999 novel by Isabelle Holland
Paperboy, a 2011 memoir by Northern Irish writer Tony Macaulay
 The Paperboy (children's book), a 1997 children's book by Dav Pilkey

Music 
 Paperboy (rapper) (born 1969), American rapper
 Eli "Paperboy" Reed (born 1982), American singer
 Paperboy Fabe (born 1984), American music producer
 Paperboys (Norwegian duo), a Norwegian hip hop duo
 The Paperboys (Canadian band), a Canadian folk music band

Songs
 "Paperboy", a song by Charles Hamilton, feat. B.o.B
 "Paperboy", a song by Stabilo from Cupid?
 "Paperboy", a song from the 2011 Bruce Hornsby musical SCKBSTD

Other uses 
 Paperboy (video game), a 1985 arcade game by Atari Games, named after the role
 Paperboy 2, the 1991 sequel
 Paperboy Prince, American artist, community activist, and politician
 Josh Wilson (baseball) (born 1981), nicknamed "The Paperboy", American baseball shortstop
 Paperboy (mobile app), India’s first newspaper aggregating mobile and web platform